Kardhiq Castle is a ruined hill fortress located in Kardhiq, southern Albania. Built between the late 14th and the early 15th century by the Zenebishi family, it was restored by Ali Pasha in the early 19th century.

History 
The castle is first mentioned in the 1431–32 register of the Sanjak of Albania. The castle has five towers, two of which are of polygonal form and similar to other castles of Ali Pasha.

Sources 

Castles in Albania
Buildings and structures in Gjirokastër
Medieval Albania